The following is a list of events and new music that happened or are expected to happen in 2020 in the Latin music industry. Latin regions include Ibero-America, Spain, Portugal, and the United States.

Events

January–March
January 6 – "Despacito" by Luis Fonsi and Daddy Yankee becomes the highest-certified song of all-time in the United States after receiving a 13× platinum certification by the Recording Industry Association of America for units of over 13 million sales plus track-equivalent streams.
January 20 – The 1st Annual Premios Odeón take place at the Teatro Real in Madrid.
#ElDisco by Alejandro Sanz wins Album of the Year.
Don Patricio and Cruz Cafuné win the Song of the Year award for the hit single "Contando Lunares".
Aitana wins the award for Best New Artist.
Colombian band Morat wins the award for Best Latin Artist.
The music video for "Con Altura", by Rosalía, J Balvin and El Guincho, wins the Video of the Year award.
January 26 – The 62nd Grammy Awards are held at the Staples Center in Los Angeles, California.
Alejandro Sanz receives his fourth career Grammy Award by winning Best Latin Pop Album for El Disco.
Rosalía wins her first Grammy Award by winning Best Latin Rock, Urban or Alternative Album for El Mal Querer.
Mariachi Los Camperos receives their second career Grammy Award by winning Best Regional Mexican Music Album for De Ayer Para Siempre.
Marc Anthony's Opus and Aymée Nuviola's A Journey Through Cuban Music both win Best Tropical Latin Album. Anthony receives his third career Grammy Award, while Nuviola wins her first one.
Chick Corea's Antidote garners his 23rd career Grammy Award by winning Best Latin Jazz Album and extends his record for the artist with most wins in jazz categories.
February 20 – The 32nd Annual Lo Nuestro Awards are held at the American Airlines Arena in Miami, Florida.
Daddy Yankee is the artist with most wins, with 7, including Artist of the Year and Single of the Year and Song of the Year for "Con Calma"; the latter two shared with Canandian rapper Snow.
Oasis by J Balvin and Bad Bunny wins Album of the Year.
Rosalía and Lunay win New Female Artist and New Male Artist, respectively.
February 29 – "Tiburones" by Ricky Martin entered the US Hot Latin Songs chart, thus he became the first and only artist in history to enter the chart across five decades, including his work as part of Menudo.
March 8Bad Bunny's second studio album YHLQMDLG (Yo Hago Lo Que Me Da La Gana) achieves the highest peak for a completely-Spanish-language album in the United States by debuting at number two, surpassing Shakira's Fijación Oral, Vol. 1 and Maná's Amar Es Combatir number four peaks. It also breaks the record for the largest streaming week for a Latin album, with 201.4 million streams, surpassing Ozuna's Aura. Additionally, all tracks from YHLQMDLG enter the US Hot Latin Songs chart in the album's debut week, with eight in the top 10 and 20 in the top 25. Bad Bunny also breaks the record for the most Spanish-language songs simultaneously charting on the Billboard Hot 100, with 11.
March 17Due to concerns of the COVID-19 pandemic, the 2020 Billboard Latin Music Awards and Latinfest+, which was scheduled for April 20–23, have been postponed.

April–June
April 2 – Following the complaints of reggaeton acts due to the Latin Record Academy not nominating reggaeton songs for its general fields' categories at the 20th Latin Grammy Awards, two new categories were created for the 2020 edition: Best Reggaeton Performance and Best Best Rap/Hip-Hop Song. A Best Pop/Rock Song category will also be introduced.
May 16 – The 9th Premios Nuestra Tierra take place live from a studio in Bogotá to celebrate the best in Colombian music.
J Balvin wins Artist of the Year,
Fantasía by Sebastián Yatra wins Album of the Year.
"Tusa" by Karol G and Nicki Minaj wins Song of the Year.
Camilo wins Best New Artist.
May 30 – Many artists reunite at 'Se Agradece' a virtual music festival organized by Mexican TV network TeleHit, to celebrate those who fight against COVID-19.

July–September
July 7 – The 28th Annual ASCAP Latin Awards are held virtually from Colombia hosted by Greeicy and Mike Bahía.
 "Con Calma" by Daddy Yankee wins Song of the Year.
 Romeo Santos wins Songwriter/Artist of the Year.
 Puerto Rican rapper Bad Bunny wins Songwriter of the Year.
July 13 – Colombian reggaeton singer Karol G reveals that she had tested positive for COVID-19 a few weeks earlier.
July 15 – The 5th Premios Pulsar take place live from a studio in Santiago to celebrate the best in Chilean music.
Cami wins Artist of the Year.
Naturaleza Muerta by Como Asesinar a Felipes wins Album of the Year.
"Aquí Estoy" by Cami wins Song of the Year.
Simón Campusano wins Best New Artist.
August 8 – "Carita de Inocente" by Prince Royce sets a new record on the Billboard Latin Tropical Airplay chart as longest-running number-one song with 20 weeks.
August 13 - Colombian reggaeton singer J Balvin reveals at the Premios Juventud he had tested positive for COVID-19.
August 15 – Billboard revamps the Latin Pop Airplay chart to reflect overall airplay of Latin pop music on Latin radio stations. Instead of ranking songs being played on Latin-pop stations, rankings are determined by the amount of airplay Latin-pop songs receive on stations that play Latin music regardless of genre. "Fútbol y Rumba" by Anuel AA featuring Enrique Iglesias becomes the first number-one song on the chart following the changes to it.
August 30 – "Qué Pena" by Maluma and J Balvin wins Best Latin at the 2020 MTV Video Music Awards.
September 14 – Billboard launches two new weekly charts, the Billboard Global 200 and Billboard Global Exclusive U.S.
The Billboard Global 200 is inclusive of worldwide songs while Billboard Global Excl. U.S. focuses on all territories outside the United States. Both collate sales and streaming data from more than 200 territories, with rankings based on a weighted formula incorporating official-only streams on both subscription and ad-supported tiers of leading digital platforms, and downloads from key online music retailers.
"Hawái" by Colombian singer Maluma becomes the first song to top the inaugural Billboard Global Excl. U.S. chart.
September 15 – Billboard ranks the 50 best Latin songs of all time including releases by Selena, Marc Anthony, Juan Luis Guerra, Luis Fonsi, Shakira, Ricky Martin, and Rosalía among others. "A Dios le Pido" by Juanes was named the best one by the magazine.
September 18 – The 22nd Premios Gardel take place live from a studio in Buenos Aires to celebrate the best in Argentinian music.
 Lebón & Co. by David Lebón wins Album of the Year.
 "Canguro" by Wos wins Song of the Year.
 Lebón & Co. by David Lebón wins Record of the Year.
 Wos win Best New Artist.
September 22 – Rolling Stone update their list of "The 500 Greatest Albums of All Time" for the first time since 2012 including six Latin recordings.
El Mal Querer (2018) by Rosalía is named the Best Latin Album of all time, reaching the 315th spot on the list.
X 100pre (2018) by Bad Bunny places at 447.
Clandestino (1998) by Manu Chao places at 469.
Barrio Fino (2004) by Daddy Yankee places at 473.
Amor Prohibido (1994) by Selena places at 479.
Dónde Están los Ladrones? (1998) by Shakira places at 496.

October–December
October 19Billboard launches the "Greatest of All-time Latin Artists chart. The list is based on the artist's performance on both the Billboard Hot Latin Songs and Top Latin Albums charts since both their inceptions in 1986 and 1993 respectively. Spanish singer Enrique Iglesias tops the chart and is followed by Luis Miguel, Selena, Marco Antonio Solís, and Vicente Fernández.
October 21The 2020 Billboard Latin Music Awards are held at the BB&T Center in Sunrise, Florida.
Puerto Rican reggaeton rappers Daddy Yankee and Bad Bunny are the biggest winners with both artists receiving seven awards.
October 22"Decepciones" by Alejandro Fernández and Calibre 50 becomes the latter's 17th number-one song on the Billboard Regional Mexican Airplay chart. With this achievement, they are the act with the most number-one songs on the chart, breaking a three-way tie with Conjunto Primavera and Intocable. It is also Fernández's third number-song on the chart.
November 8 – The 27th MTV Europe Music Awards air on MTV.
 Karol G wins Best Latin.
 Pabllo Vittar wins Best Brazilian Act.
 Danna Paola wins Best Latin America North Act.
 Sebastián Yatra wins Best Latin America Central Act.
 Lali wins Best Latin America South Act.
 Fernando Daniel wins Best Portuguese Act.
 La La Love You wins Best Spanish Act.
November 19The 21st Annual Latin Grammy Awards take place at the American Airlines Arena in Miami.
Un Canto Por México, Vol. 1 by Natalia Lafourcade wins Album of the Year.
"Contigo" by Alejandro Sanz wins Record of the Year.
"René" by Residente wins Song of the Year.
Mike Bahía wins Best New Artist.
Rosalía (Best Urban Song; Best Urban Fusion/Performance; Best Short Form Music Video), Natalia Lafourcade (Album of the Year; Best Alternative Song; Best Regional Song) and Carlos Vives (Best Contemporany Tropical/Tropical Fusion Album; Best Tropical Song; Best Long Form Music Video) become the most awarded acts of the night. J Balvin, who was the most nominated artist of the night with 13 nominations, only took the award for Best Urban Album for Colores.
 November 27All tracks from Bad Bunny's third solo studio album El Último Tour del Mundo debut at the top 30 of the Spotify Global chart. "La Noche de Anoche", his collaboration with Rosalía, marks the record for the most streamed song sung in Spanish in 24 hours in history with 6.63 million streams in a single day.
December 5The 15th LOS40 Music Awards take place in a television set in Madrid.
En Tus Planes by David Bisbal wins Best Spanish Album.
"Si Tú la Quieres" by David Bisbal and Aitana wins Best Spanish Song.
Maluma wins Best Latin Artist.
"Hawái" by Maluma wins Best Latin Song.
 December 12
El Último Tour del Mundo by Bad Bunny becomes the first album completely sung in Spanish to reach number-one on the Billboard 200.
Bad Bunny is also the first Latin artist to reach number-one on the Billboard Global 200 chart with his song "Dakiti" (a duet with Jhay Cortez).

Number-one albums and singles by country

List of Billboard Argentina Hot 100 number-one singles of 2020
List of number-one albums of 2020 (Mexico)
List of number-one songs of 2020 (Mexico)
List of number-one albums of 2020 (Portugal)
List of number-one albums of 2020 (Spain)

List of number-one singles of 2020 (Spain)
List of number-one Billboard Latin Albums from the 2010s
List of Billboard number-one Latin songs of 2020
List of number-one Billboard Regional Mexican Songs of 2020
List of number-one songs of 2020 (Puerto Rico)

Awards

Latin music awards
32nd Lo Nuestro Awards
2020 Billboard Latin Music Awards
2020 Latin Grammy Awards
2020 Heat Latin Music Awards
2020 MTV Millennial Awards

Awards with Latin categories
27th Billboard Music Awards
62nd Grammy Awards
7th iHeartRadio Music Awards
15th Los40 Music Awards
37th MTV Video Music Awards
22nd Teen Choice Awards
1st Premios Odeón

Spanish-language songs on the Billboard Hot 100
The Billboard Hot 100 ranks the most-played songs in the United States based on sales (physical and digital), radio play, and online streaming. Also included are certifications awarded by the Recording Industry Association of America (RIAA), both standard and Latin. In 2020, a total of 19 Spanish-language songs have debuted in the Billboard Hot 100. From the Latin songs released in 2020, "Dakiti" by Bad Bunny and Jhay Cortez has been the highest-peaking of the year, having reached number 5.

Spanish and Portuguese-language songs on the Billboard Global 200
On September 19, 2020, Billboard established the Global 200 chart, which ranks the top songs globally  based on digital sales and online streaming from over 200 territories worldwide. The list displays every song in Spanish and Portuguese that has ranked on this chart in 2020 since its inception. "Dakiti by Bad Bunny and Jhay Cortez became the first Latin song to top the chart. Four other Latin songs reached the top-ten in 2020.

Albums released 
The following is a list of notable Latin albums (music performed in Spanish or Portuguese)  that have been released in Latin America, Spain, Portugal, or the United States in 2020.

First-quarter

January

February

March

Second quarter

April

May

June

Third quarter

July

August

September

Fourth-quarter

October

November

December

Year-End

Performance in the United States

Albums
The following is a list of the 10 best-performing Latin albums in the United States  according to Billboard and Nielsen SoundScan, which compiles data from traditional sales and album-equivalent units. Equivalent album units are based on album sales, track equivalent albums (10 tracks sold equals one album sale), and streaming equivalent albums (3,750 ad-supported streams or 1,250 paid subscription streams equals one album sale).

Songs
The following is a list of the 10 best-performing Latin songs in the United States  according to Billboard and Nielsen SoundScan, which compiles data from streaming activity, digital sales and radio airplay.

Airplay in Latin America
The following is a list of the 10 most-played Latin songs on radio stations in Latin America in the tracking period of January 1, 2020 through November 30, 2020, according to Monitor Latino.

By country

By artist

Performance in non-Spanish-speaking countries

Deaths
January 4Puerto Plata, 96, Dominican singer and guitarist.
January 10Carlos "Cuco" Rojas, 67, Colombian harpist.
January 27Alberto Naranjo, 78, Venezuelan musician.
March 4Adelaide Chiozzo, 88, Brazilian actress, accordionist and singer
March 10Marcelo Peralta, 59, Argentine multi-instrumentalist and composer (COVID-19)
March 22Carmen de Mairena (Miguel Brau i Gou), 87, Spanish cuplé singer
March 30Riachão, 98, Brazilian samba composer and singer
May 1Tavo Limongi, 52, Mexican guitarist and singer (Resorte)
May 14Jorge Santana, 68, Mexican guitarist (Malo)
May 15Sergio Denis, 71, Argentine singer, songwriter and actor
May 25Otto de la Rocha, 86, Nicaraguan singer, songwriter and actor
June 4Fabiana Anastácio, 45, Brazilian CCM singer (COVID-19)
June 9Pau Donés, 53,  Spanish songwriter, guitarist, and vocalist
June 26Narcisa Toldrà, 96, Spanish singer and musician
June 28Manuel Donley, 92, Mexican-born Tejano singer and musician
July 11Iñaxi Etxabe, 87, Spanish bertsolari singer
July 16Víctor Víctor, 71, Dominican singer-songwriter and guitarist, COVID-19.
July 18Martha Flores, 91, Cuban radio host, journalist and singer
September 12Joaquín Carbonell, 73, Spanish singer-songwriter and poet (COVID-19)
September 14Alicia Maguiña, 81, Peruvian composer and singer
October 28Cano Estremera, 62, Puerto Rican salsa singer
December 11, 80, Brazilian musician (Fundo de Quintal; COVID-19)
December 26Tito Rojas, 65, Puerto Rican salsa singer, heart attack.
December 28Armando Manzanero, 85, Mexican singer-songwriter ("Somos Novios (It's Impossible)", "Mía", "Adoro"), Grammy winner (2014), COVID-19.

Notes

References

 
Latin music by year